The Marstrand Church is a church building in Marstrand, Sweden. It 
belongs to the  Marstrand Parish  of the Diocese of Gothenburg of the Church of Sweden.

History

The original church is believed to have been built of wood during the reign Harald Gille who was king of Norway from 1130 until his death in 1136.  The current church was built of gray-washed natural stone between 1270 to 1319 and was probably a church for a Franciscan order. Major extensions and extensions were carried out in 1690, 1804 and 1807-1809. It was rebuilt in 1806 and renovated in 1912.

The pulpit  is from 1691 and was built in baroque design. Rebuilding in 1852 has changed the pulpit into a more neoclassical style. An octagonal baptismal font with neoclassical design is made in 1912 after drawings by architect Ture Gabriel Schaar  (1864-1945).

References

External links

Marstrand
14th-century churches in Sweden
Churches in Västra Götaland County
Churches converted from the Roman Catholic Church to the Church of Sweden
Churches in the Diocese of Gothenburg
Buildings and structures in Kungälv Municipality